Man Group plc is an active investment management business listed on the London Stock Exchange. It provides a range of funds across liquid and private markets for institutional and private investors globally and is the world's largest publicly traded hedge fund company, reporting $151.4 billion in funds under management as of March 2022. The firm is headquartered at Riverbank House in London and employs over 1,400 people in various locations worldwide. The company was a sponsor of the Man Booker Prize from 2002 to 2019.

History
The company was founded by James Man in 1783 as a sugar cooperage and brokerage, based in Harp Lane in Billingsgate. The following year Man Group won the contract to supply the Royal Navy with the rum for its daily "rum tot", a tradition under which all sailors were allocated a daily rum ration. This tradition continued until 1970, with Man Group holding the contract throughout. The company further expanded from sugar and rum into other commodities such as coffee and cocoa. The company traded as a commodities business throughout the 19th and 20th century, gradually diversifying into financial services following the advent of financial exchanges to hedge commodity exposures.

The firm was renamed ED&F Man in 1869, based on the initials of James Man's grandsons Edward Desborough Man and Fredrick Man. ED&F Man listed on the London Stock Exchange in 1994. In 2000 the company divided into two entirely separate businesses, with Man Group plc focusing exclusively on financial services and ED&F Man (the commodities division) taken private in a management buy-out.

In 2007 Man Group moved into its present form as an investment management business, following the demerger and flotation of its brokerage business (known as MF Global) on the New York Stock Exchange. Man Group attained its current structure over time through acquisitions, which have now been fully integrated to form investment engines. Man AHL is the oldest investment manager of the group, having been acquired over time from 1989 to 1994. Man Group's other investment managers were formed via acquisition between 2010 and 2017, beginning with the 2010 acquisition of Man GLG (previously GLG Partners) for $1.6 billion, followed by Man FRM in 2012, Man Numeric in 2014 and Man GPM in 2017.

In late 2017, Man Group announced the creation of a quantitative hedge fund in China. The firm has held licenses to operate in the country since 2012, but was provided clearance to operate as a private securities investment fund manager: Man is one of the first systematic investment managers to receive this accreditation. The fund will be managed by Man's AHL division. More recently, Man AHL received approval for a qualified foreign institutional investor ("QFII") license in China.

Structure and operations
Man Group has five investment engines that offer a broad range of alternative and long-only strategies, run on a systematic and discretionary basis across liquid and private markets. It employs over 500 quants and technologists, offers over 75 investment strategies across a variety of investment approaches, styles and asset classes and trades in over 800 markets around the world.

Man AHL 
Founded in 1987, Man AHL is a diversified quantitative investment manager offering absolute return and long-only funds, with both momentum and non-momentum strategies.

Man Numeric 
Man Numeric was established in 1989 and acquired by Man Group in 2014. A Boston-based quantitative asset manager, Man Numeric offers long-only, active extension and hedged equity strategies. Man Group acquired Man Numeric to build a diversified quantitative fund management business in non-momentum strategies, and to develop Man Group's presence in the North American market.

Man GLG 
Man GLG was established in London in 1995 as GLG Partners. It was publicly listed in 2007 before being acquired by Man Group in 2010 for $1.6 billion. Man GLG is a multi-team discretionary investment manager. Man GLG utilises absolute return and long-only strategies across asset classes, sectors and geographies. The January 2015 acquisition of Silvermine was expected to boost the division's US CLO business.

Man FRM 
Established in 1991, and acquired by Man Group in 2012, Man FRM's research and investment professionals operate from London, New York, Tokyo, Guernsey and Pfäffikon (SZ), Switzerland.

Man GPM 
Man Global Private Markets Group (Man GPM) launched in 2017, with the completed acquisition of Aalto Invest Holding AG, a real estate investment management company with $1.7bn in assets under management at the time.

Senior Management
Luke Ellis was appointed as Man Group's CEO in September 2016.

In September 2021, Man Group announced a number of changes to its senior management, which became effective from 1 October 2021. Mark Jones, previously the firm’s CFO, was appointed Deputy CEO for Man Group with responsibility for Man AHL, Man Numeric and the Group's technology functions. In addition, Antoine Forterre, previously Co-CEO of Man AHL, was appointed as Man Group's CFO and joined the Board.

Mergers and acquisitions

RMF and Bernard Madoff
RMF, a former division of Man Group, invested 0.5% of its funds under management at the time with various third-party funds which, in turn, had positions in funds ultimately managed by Bernard Madoff. RMF was one of 107 financial institutions and 13,000 individuals to invest in such funds. As of 2014, 59% of all such funds have been recovered and returned to various institutions and individuals.

Man Booker Prizes
Man Group sponsored the Man Booker literary prize from 2002 to 2019. Described by The Telegraph as "...arguably the UK's most prestigious" literary prize, the £50,000 award was created in 1973 to increase the reading of quality fiction and attract "the intelligent general audience".

Corporate responsibility
Man Group supports various charitable initiatives focused on promoting education, which are run primarily through the Man Charitable Trust and the Man US Charitable Foundation:

Man Charitable Trust and the Man US Charitable Foundation 
Set up in 1978, The Man Charitable Trust is an independent registered charity that funds small to medium-size charities focusing on literacy and numeracy programmes. It also funds programmes in support of access to education for disadvantaged people. In 2019, Man Group launched the Man US Charitable Foundation to provide funding and volunteering opportunities in the US. In 2021, Man Group donated $4 million dollars to both charities.

King's Maths School 
Man Group is a charitable supporter of King’s College London Mathematics School ('King's Maths School'), a specialist state-funded school for gifted mathematicians aged 16-19 that is run in partnership with King's College London. The school brings high quality mathematics education to students who have a particular aptitude and enthusiasm for the subject, and it offers a genuine access route for students who come from backgrounds that are often underrepresented in mathematical sciences.

Oxford-Man Institute 
In June 2007 Man launched a joint project with the University of Oxford, the Oxford-Man Institute of Quantitative Finance. Man Group's initial financial commitment to the institute was £13.75 million, one of the largest single donations to a British higher education institution in recent years. In 2016 the Oxford-Man Institute expanded its focus on machine learning and data analytics, becoming part of the University of Oxford's Department of Engineering Science. The development of the OMI's focus creates a hub for machine learning and data analysis at Eagle House, the current home of the OMI and Man AHL's Oxford Research lab.

In December 2019, The University of Oxford and Man Group announced that funding support for the Oxford-Man Institute (OMI) had been agreed for a further five years.

Former sponsorships and charitable initiatives 
Man Group is a former sponsor of the Man Group International Climate Change Award and the Man Asian Literary Prize. In the 1990s, Man was a founding member of the East London Partnership, which became the East London Business Alliance, a business-community outreach charity promoting corporate social responsibility and employee volunteering.

See also

Hedge fund
Man Booker Prize
Man Booker International Prize
List of investors in Bernard L. Madoff Securities

References

Further reading
 Jenkins, Alan C., 1989, The House of Man, London, UK: Rainbird Publishing.

External links
 Official site

 

Financial services companies based in the City of London
Companies listed on the London Stock Exchange
Hedge fund firms in the United Kingdom
Madoff investment scandal
Financial services companies established in 1783
1783 establishments in England
Hedge funds
British companies established in 1783